Levan Tskitishvili (born 10 October 1976) is a Georgian former professional footballer who played as a midfielder.

Career 
Born in Tbilisi, Tskitishvili started playing for Dinamo Tbilisi in 1994, and in 1998 he was transferred to SC Freiburg, teaming up with other Georgian players. During his time with Freiburg the midfielder Tskitishvili played 111 Bundesliga games. Following the relegation of SC Freiburg in 2005 he was on the verge of signing for Metalurg Donetsk, but instead he accepted a contract with VfL Wolfsburg. He joined SV Wehen Wiesbaden on 1 February 2009, signed a contract until 30 June 2010, but left the club the 2008–09 season. He played 33 games in the 2. Bundesliga.

International 
Tskitishvili was capped 56 times and scored one goal for the Georgia national team. He captained the Georgia side in a 2–0 defeat by Italy.

References

External links
 Zkitishvili in Bundesliga
 
 

1976 births
Living people
Footballers from Tbilisi
Footballers from Georgia (country)
Association football midfielders
Georgia (country) international footballers
FC Dinamo Tbilisi players
SC Freiburg players
VfL Wolfsburg players
FC Metalurh Donetsk players
Panionios F.C. players
FC Lokomotivi Tbilisi players
SV Wehen Wiesbaden players
Bundesliga players
Ukrainian Premier League players
Super League Greece players
Expatriate footballers from Georgia (country)
Expatriate sportspeople from Georgia (country) in Greece
Expatriate footballers in Greece
Expatriate sportspeople from Georgia (country) in Germany
Expatriate footballers in Germany
Expatriate sportspeople from Georgia (country) in Ukraine
Expatriate footballers in Ukraine